Ram Achal Rajbhar is an Indian politician and currently a member of Samajwadi Party. He is a five-time MLA from Uttar Pradesh Legislative Assembly.

Previously Ram had contested from the Akbarpur assembly constituency as a Bahujan Samaj Party candidate in the 2017 Uttar Pradesh Legislative Assembly election and won the seat by defeating Samajwadi Party's Ram Murti Verma by a margin of 14,013, serving as an MLA in the assembly from 2017 to 2022.

As a member of the Samajwadi Party, Ram contested from Akbarpur in the 2022 Uttar Pradesh Legislative Assembly election and emerged victorious in this seat by 12,000 votes, beating BJP candidate Dharamraj Nishad by a margin of 12,455 votes.

References 

Living people
Samajwadi Party politicians
Samajwadi Party politicians from Uttar Pradesh
Uttar Pradesh MLAs 2022–2027
Uttar Pradesh MLAs 1993–1996
Uttar Pradesh MLAs 1997–2002
Uttar Pradesh MLAs 2002–2007
Uttar Pradesh MLAs 2007–2012
Bahujan Samaj Party politicians from Uttar Pradesh
Year of birth missing (living people)